Acadia Healthcare is an American provider of behavioral healthcare services. It operates a network of over 225 facilities across the United States and Puerto Rico.

Overview 
The company was founded in January 2005, and is headquartered in Franklin, Tennessee. More recently, the company had signed a deal with the Florida healthcare system in order to expand its programs.

In 2022 it opened a new children’s hospital in Chicago, a joint venture facility in Knoxville, and two new Comprehensive Treatment Centers.  Revenue for the third quarter of the year was $666.7 million, an increase of 13.5% over the third quarter of 2021. It had a network of 242 behavioral healthcare facilities with approximately 10,800 beds in 39 states and Puerto Rico. 300 new beds are planned to be opened during the year.

Operations

United States
Acadia operates facilities assisting patients with behavioral problems, PTSD, trauma, eating disorders and substance abuse.  In 2022 it had about 22,500 employees and a daily patient census of about 70,000 patients and was said to be the largest pure-play behavioral health company.

United Kingdom

In June 2014, Acadia bought Partnerships in Care, a British provider of mental health and social care services, and acquired the mental health assets of Care UK in May 2015.

The company has been investigated by the Competition and Markets Authority in the UK in order to deal with concerns about the impact of its acquisition of Priory Group on competition. It sold 22 behavioral health facilities for £320 million to BC Partners in October 2016.

References

External links 

Drug and alcohol rehabilitation centers
Private providers of NHS services
Companies listed on the Nasdaq
Health care companies based in Tennessee
Companies based in Nashville, Tennessee